This is a list of Nigerian films scheduled for theatrical release in 2018.

2018

January–March

April–June

July–December

See also
2018 in Nigeria
List of Nigerian films

References

External links
2018 films at the Internet Movie Database
Nigerian actors and actresses biography at Uzomedia TV

2018
Lists of 2018 films by country or language
Films